A takedown gun (typically a takedown rifle or takedown shotgun) is a long gun designed to be taken apart significantly reducing its length, making it easier to store, pack, transport and conceal.  A variety of barrel, stock, and receiver designs have been invented to facilitate takedown.  For example, the hinged design of many break-action firearms allows takedown.  Some regular firearms can be modified to allow takedown after custom gunsmithing.

Rifles

American gun manufacturers including Marlin, Ruger, Savage, and Winchester have made takedown rifles since the late 1800s. Some early examples include the Browning 22 Semi-Auto rifle,  Remington Model 24 and Remington Model 8 made by Fabrique Nationale and Remington Arms. Many militaries in the early 20th century also experimented with takedown systems, particularly for the use by paratroopers. An example of this being the Japanese experimental TERA Rifles.

Shotguns

Most single barrel and double barrel shotguns readily break down into separate buttstock, barrel and forestock and are often transported cased as takedown guns. Among repeating shotguns, the Winchester Model 97 and Model 12 shotguns were factory made as takedown guns. Savage also makes a series of takedown over/under rifle/shotgun combination guns.

Survival guns 

Survival guns such as the ArmaLite AR-7 may be disassembled and its barrel, action and magazines stored within its plastic butt-stock. This lightweight , .22 caliber (5.6 mm), semi-automatic rifle measures  overall when assembled,  when disassembled and can even float. Although the AR-7 was designed as a pilot and aircrew survival weapon, it is commonly used by target shooters and backpackers, and is frequently stowed away in vehicles and boats.

See also
Poacher's gun, the 18th century precursor to the takedown rifle

References

 Carmichel, Jim. .  Outdoor Life.  Feb 1, 2004.  Accessed 2008-06-16.

Firearm construction
Rifles
Shotguns
 Takedown gun